James Riley (11 December 1860 – 8 November 1937) was an English cricketer.  Riley was a right-handed batsman who bowled right-arm medium pace.  He was born at Kirkby-in-Ashfield, Nottinghamshire.

Riley made two first-class appearances for Nottinghamshire in 1898 against Derbyshire at Trent Bridge in the County Championship and against the Marylebone Cricket Club at Lord's.  These two matches saw him score a total of 3 runs and bowled a total of 23 wicketless overs.

He died at Derby, Derbyshire on 8 November 1937.

References

External links
James Riley at ESPNcricinfo
James Riley at CricketArchive

1860 births
1937 deaths
People from Kirkby-in-Ashfield
Cricketers from Nottinghamshire
English cricketers
Nottinghamshire cricketers